Rossi is a locality in the Queanbeyan–Palerang Regional Council, New South Wales, Australia. It is located about 33 km southeast of Queanbeyan and 25 km north of Captains Flat.

References

Localities in New South Wales
Queanbeyan–Palerang Regional Council
Southern Tablelands